Ramazan Özkepir (born January 2, 1955) is a Turkish jurist. He serves as chief judge of the Court of Cassation of Turkey Yargıtay 19th criminal circuit. He is a former member of the presidential council of the Court of Cassation.

Early life
He was born in Aksaray, Turkey. He received a Bachelor of Laws degree in 1981 from Istanbul University. After he served as prosecutor and judge in several provinces, he was appointed to Yargıtay, Court of Cassation of Turkey as an investigating judge. He was elected as a member of the Court of Cassation on April 15, 2007. Özkepir was also member of Court of Jurisdictional Disputes from 2007 to 2011 and member of the presidential council of the Court of Cassation from 2016 to 2018.,

Author
Özkepir is the author of numerous books and articles.

Here are some of his other works:

Mala Karşı Suçlar
Belgelerde Sahtecilik ve Bilişim Alanında Suçlar,
Hırsızlık Suçları,
Kasten Adam Öldürme Suçları,
Ağır Ceza Davaları,
Açıklamalı-İçtihatlı Ceza Muhakemeleri Usulü Kanunu,
İçtihatlı Türk Ceza Kanunu,
Belediye Mevzuatı,
Yeni TCK-CMK-CGİK Ceza ve Yargılamada Temel Yasalar,
Ceza Muhakemesi Kanunu Şerhi
Özel Ceza Kanunları

References

Sources
Court of Cassation Bio

1955 births
Living people
Court of Cassation (Turkey) justices
Istanbul University Faculty of Law alumni
Turkish judges